"Envy Me" is the debut single by American rapper and singer Calboy. It was released on September 13, 2018 as the lead single from his debut EP Wildboy. It is known as his breakout single. The song peaked at number 31 on the Billboard Hot 100, making it his first song to chart and his first top 40 entry. It has become a staple on SoundCloud, achieving over 130 million streams. Rolling Stone called it "one of the most successful rap records in the country" at the peak of the song's popularity (in the United States).

Critical reception 
Rolling Stone called the song "eerie, bright and hyper-violent", and that it "revels in the dichotomy of Calboy's delivery and is one of the reasons it's an off-kilter hit."

Music video 
A music video was released on Calboy's official YouTube channel on August 27, 2018, before the supposed release of the single. It reached 25 million views by January 2019 and as of May 19, 2021, it has amassed over 200 million views.

Charts

Weekly charts

Year-end charts

Certifications

References

2018 debut singles
2018 songs